Wiest may refer to:

People with the surname
Dianne Wiest (born 1948), American actress
Howard Wiest (1864–1945), American jurist, Chief Justice of the Michigan Supreme Court
Stephan Wiest (1748–1797), Catholic priest and academic
Steve Wiest (born 1957), jazz trombonist, composer, educator
Susanne Wiest (born 1967), German social activist
Emily Wiest (born 1998). American scholar and academic

Places
Wiest Bluff, location in Antarctica
German toponymic surnames